Fairfax is an American adult animated comedy streaming television series created by Matt Hausfater, Aaron Buchsbaum, and Teddy Riley. The series is voiced by Skyler Gisondo, Kiersey Clemons, Peter S. Kim, and Jaboukie Young-White. It was released on Amazon Prime Video on October 29, 2021. Season 2 was released on June 10, 2022.

Premise
Four middle school best friends embark on a never-ending quest for popularity on Fairfax Avenue – Los Angeles' pulsing heart of hypebeast culture.

Cast and characters

Main
 Skyler Gisondo as Dale
 Kiersey Clemons as Derica
 Peter S. Kim as Benny
 Jaboukie Young-White as Truman

Guest
 Pamela Adlon as Phyllis
 Jeff Bottoms as The Plug
 Yvette Nicole Brown as Trini
 Rob Delaney as Grant
 Zoey Deutch as Lily
 Colton Dunn as Principal Weston
 John Leguizamo as Glenn the pigeon
 Camila Mendes as Melody
 Larry Owens as Jules
 Linda Park as Joy
 Billy Porter as Hiroki Hassan
 Ben Schwartz as Cody
 Tim Simons as Brian
 J. B. Smoove as Quattro the pigeon
 SungWon Cho as Jay
 Dr. Phil as himself

Episodes

Series overview

Season 1 (2021)

Season 2 (2022)

Production
The project was first announced to be in development at Amazon Studios on December 19, 2019, with Matt Hausfater attached as co-creator. On January 29, 2020, Amazon Prime Video gave the project a 2-season order consisting of 8 half-hour episodes per season, with Aaron Buchsbaum and Teddy Riley joining as co-creators and executive producing the project alongside Hausfater. It was also announced that Chris Prynoski, Shannon Prynoski, and Ben Kalina of Titmouse, Inc. were set to also executive produce the series alongside Serious Business. The characters for the series were designed by graphic designer Somehoodlum.

On September 29, 2021, it was announced that Skyler Gisondo, Kiersey Clemons, Peter S. Kim, and Jaboukie Young-White would make up the main voice cast with Pamela Adlon, Yvette Nicole Brown, Rob Delaney, Zoey Deutch, John Leguizamo, Camila Mendes, Billy Porter, and Ben Schwartz among the guest stars.

Release
All eight episodes of the first season premiered on Amazon Prime Video on October 29, 2021.

References

External links
 
 

2020s American adult animated television series
2020s American animated comedy television series
2020s American teen sitcoms
2021 American television series debuts
Amazon Prime Video original programming
American adult animated comedy television series
American animated sitcoms
American flash adult animated television series
Television series about social media
English-language television shows
Middle school television series
Teen animated television series
Television series by Amazon Studios
Animated television series by Amazon Studios
Television shows set in Los Angeles